86th meridian may refer to:

86th meridian east, a line of longitude east of the Greenwich Meridian
86th meridian west, a line of longitude west of the Greenwich Meridian